Betty Earles was a small gasoline-powered vessel built in 1913 on Lake Crescent, Washington.  The vessel was transferred to Puget Sound in about 1919 and remained in service there until at least 1958.

Career
In 1913, Michael Earles, owner of the Sol Duc Hot Springs Resort, built on Lake Crescent the gasoline-launch Betty Earles (named after his daughter) to take guests bound for his lodge from the head of the lake to Fairholm, at the western end, where they would disembark and ride motor buses to his resort.

Michael Earles' Sol Duc lodge burned down around 1918, and he moved Betty Earles off Lake Crescent to serve on Puget Sound under the command of Captain O. G. Olson.  In 1924, Betty Earles was sold to Tacoma Tug & Barge Co. Betty Earles was still in service as a tug as late as 1958, still under the old name

References

See also
 Storm King, a ferry operated on the lake by Clallam County, Washington.
 Steamboats of Lake Crescent, Washington

1913 ships
Steamboats of Washington (state)
Ships built in Washington (state)
Tugboats of the United States
History of Clallam County, Washington
Transportation in Clallam County, Washington